Stephen Lee (born 5 January 1978 in Brisbane) is an Australian short track speed skater. He has competed at the 2002 and 2006 Winter Olympics and the 2005 World Championships in China.

He is a news cameraman for Channel 7 in Brisbane when not skating.

References

1978 births
Living people
Australian male short track speed skaters
Olympic short track speed skaters of Australia
Short track speed skaters at the 2002 Winter Olympics
Short track speed skaters at the 2006 Winter Olympics
Sportspeople from Brisbane